Linda Ejiofor (born Linda Ihuoma Ejiofor; 17 July 1986) is a Nigerian actress and model from Abia state known for her role as Bimpe Adekoya in M-Net's TV series Tinsel. She was nominated for Best Actress in a Supporting Role at the 9th Africa Movie Academy Awards for her role in the film The Meeting (2012). Tony Ogaga Erhariefe of The Sun Nigeria listed her as one of the ten fastest-rising Nollywood stars of 2013. She gave birth to her first child, a boy.

Personal life

A native of Isuikwuato, Ejiofor was born in Lagos, Nigeria. She is the second of five children. Ejiofor attended Ilabor Primary School in Surulere and later enrolled at the Federal Government Girls' College in Onitsha. She also studied sociology at the University of Port Harcourt. On 4 November 2018, she announced her engagement to Tinsel actor Ibrahim Suleiman and married him four days later.

Career
Ejiofor initially wanted to work for an advertising agency. In an interview posted in The Nation newspaper, she said she changed her mind about pursuing a career in advertising after developing interest in acting. She also said she hoped to direct films in the future. In 2018, she starred alongside Jemima Osunde in Ndani TV's web series Rumour Has It.

Filmography

Films

Television

Awards

See also
 List of Nigerian actors

References

21st-century Nigerian actresses
Actresses from Lagos
Nigerian female models
Nigerian film actresses
University of Port Harcourt alumni
Living people
1986 births
Igbo actresses
Actresses from Abia State
Nigerian film award winners